Kaadu is a 1973 Indian Malayalam-language film, directed by P. Subramaniam. The film stars Madhu, Thikkurissy Sukumaran Nair, Shanthi and C. L. Anandan. The film had musical score by Vedpal Verma.

The film was simultaneously made in Tamil as Malai Naattu Mangai, with Gemini Ganesan, in the lead role along with Sasikumar and C. L. Anandan in prominent roles. The film was remade in Hindi as Hum Junglee Hain.

Cast
Madhu as Rajendran
Vijayasree as Maala
Vincent as Veeran
Thikkurissy Sukumaran Nair as Kaattumooppan
K. V. Shanthi as Ganga
C. L. Anandan as Vikraman/Swami
Kottarakkara Sreedharan Nair as Menon
Bahadoor as Sekhar
S. P. Pillai as Sankar
P. R. Varalakshmi as Menon's daughter

Soundtrack

References

External links
 

1973 films
1970s Malayalam-language films
Indian multilingual films
1973 multilingual films
Malayalam films remade in other languages